Crystal Carson (born June 24, 1967) is an American acting coach and former actress.

Early life 
Carson has been teaching and coaching professionally in Los Angeles for the last 20 years. Prior to that, she worked as an actress in 25 theatre repertory and summer stock companies; in several films including Who's That Girl with Madonna, starring in the cult spoof film Killer Tomatoes Strike Back with John Astin, the lead actress in the suspense drama Eclipse, the female lead in the action-packed Cartel, the girl of the sweet boy meets girl story, Fade Away opposite Noah Blake, and Blue Star in the video game Blue Star with Lamont Bentley, among others.

Career 
Among her television credits are a contract role as Julia Barrett on the ABC soap opera General Hospital (1991–1993; 1997; 1998).  Her character Julia was a successful businesswoman and older sister to troubled teen Brenda (Vanessa Marcil).

She was also cast as Trish in the 1985 B-movie horror film The Zero Boys and as Denise, a bridesmaid in the 1987 Madonna film Who's That Girl.

In television, Carson appeared for 3 weeks on the award-winning episodic JAG, 6 weeks on the mega-hit Dallas, and had guest starring roles on Ellen, Charles in Charge, Midnight Caller, Cheers, Thirtysomething, Simon & Simon and Night Court.

As for the above-mentioned role of “Julia Barrett” that Carson portrayed on General Hospital, it was responsible for her being voted "Best New Female" by Soap Opera Digest and put on their cover as one of "Television's Most Beautiful Women", and then nominated for "Best Female Newcomer" on the Soap Opera Digest Awards in 1992. 
	
More recently, Carson has committed to pursuing a full-time career as an acting coach. Carson was employed by Fox-TV (2004–05) as the on-set coach for a full season of the crime procedural, The Inside, where she focused primarily on lead actress Rachel Nichols. Currently, she guest teaches at the Margie Haber Studios, where she has been employed for 16 years. She conducts seminars at The University of Nebraska, and continues to coach privately.

Her clients, over 30 working actors, have included Paula Abdul, Jennifer Beals (L Word), David Boreanaz (Bones), Brittany Daniel (Joe Dirt, White Chicks, The Game), RonReaco Lee (Guess Who, Committed), Vanessa Marcil (Las Vegas), Rachel Nichols (Alias, Amityville Horror, Them), Tricia Helfer (Battlestar Galactica, Memorie), Atossa Leoni (Kite Runner), Natassia Malthe (The Other Side of the Tracks, Fallen, DOA: Dead or Alive), Ross Patterson (The New Guy, American Pie, House of the Dead 2, The Darwin Awards) Stephen Rider (Daredevil, Elementary) and Brian White (The Shield, Mr. 3000, Chicago Fire, Ray Donovan).

Teaching experience 
Crystal Carson Studios - Owner, Teacher, Private Acting Coach 1995 - Currently

ReActing by Heart class and Auditioning by Heart 3-day intensive workshop - Creator of these traveling

workshops, and teaching at various locations, including: Los Angeles Center Studios ; Reel Pros Studios: Los Angeles; Atlanta Media Campus and Studios - 4 times annually; Actors Center:

London; The Actor's Centre & Diorama Studios: Dublin - The Lab; Pinewood Studios: Atlanta ; Three of Us Studios: NYC; Omaha Performing Arts - Holland Center; and Johnny Carson School of Theatre and Film - UNL, Nebraska 1995 - Currently

Sunday Industry Panel - Founder, Master of Ceremonies 2006 - Currently

Studio Institute Global - Los Angeles Center Studios; Downtown Campus  (2000 - Currently)

Industry Hollywood - Host teacher of audition technique classes for actors from the U.K. (2007 - 2017) Saigon International Film School - 5 day acting workshop in Vietnam (2014) 

Margie Haber Studios – Guest-teacher of audition technique classes (1993 - 2007)

The Studio - International film actor's training - Lead acting workshops with German actors (1993 – 2006) NYC Seminars / Margie Haber – Taught biannual 4-day seminars in New York at Three of Us (1993 - 2000)

Professional Actors Theatre of the Handicapped; sponsored by CBS-TV - taught classes (1992–94) Arrowhead Retreats – Co-taught workshops with television director, Phil Romano & Al Valetta (1991 – 96)

Charity work: Carson founded "Take a Chance with the Stars," a celebrity casino night benefitting the American Cancer Society, which raised more than $100,000. She is also on the board of "Enrichment Works" a non-profit keeping theatre in elementary schools by providing classes, workshops and productions since 1999.

Personal life 
Carson was diagnosed with stage 3 cancer.

References

External links

Interviews and articles with Crystal Carson.

1967 births
Living people
American film actresses
American soap opera actresses
American television actresses
American acting coaches
People from Spalding, Nebraska
21st-century American women